The Student politics of Bangladesh encompasses the activities and culture among Bangladeshi students, mostly from the tertiary level of education, as part of the support they demonstrate for political parties at the national level.

Major student organizations

Bangladesh Students' Union

Bangladesh Chhatra League

Bangladesh Jatiotabadi Chatra Dal

Bangladesh Islami Chhatra Shibir

Islami Shasantantra Chhatra Andolan

Jatiya Chhatra Samaj

Bangladesh Chhatra League (JASOD)

Current situation 
Student politics in Bangladesh is reactive, confrontational, and violent. Student organizations act as armaments of the political parties they are part of. So every now and then there are affrays and commotions.
 Over the years, political clashes and factional feuds in universities killed many, seriously interfering with academics. Women harassment is also a major problem of student politics. To relieve tensions, universities often must resort to lengthy closures, resulting in truncated and overcrowded classes.

The student wings of ruling parties run campuses and residence halls through crime and violence. They control access to amenities in residence halls, favoring fellow party members and loyal pupils; eat for free from nearby restaurants, and help themselves to products from shops nearby; practice extortion; and take money from freshmen. Further, they put pressure on teachers for payment in exchange for supporting to school administration their hiring and retention.

Abrar Fahad, a second year student in the electrical and electronic engineering department, was tortured and killed by Chhatra League leaders in Sher-e-Bangla Hall in 2019.

References 

Political activism
!